An igneous intrusion is a form of geologic feature.

Intrusion may also refer to:

 Intrusion (film), a 2021 American psychological thriller
 Intrusion (novel), a 2012 British sci-fi novel by Ken MacLeod
 Intrusion (orthodontics), the movement of a tooth into bone
 Saltwater intrusion, the movement of saline into freshwater aquifers
 Intrusion, an object on a page which causes a textual runaround (typography)

See also
 
 Intruder (disambiguation)
 Intruders (disambiguation)
 Intruso (disambiguation)
 Extrusion